Albanian Airlines operated the following scheduled international services (as of October 2011):

Europe
Albania
Tirana – Tirana International Airport Nënë Tereza Hub
Italy
Bologna – Bologna Guglielmo Marconi Airport
Pisa – Galileo Galilei Airport
Turin – Turin Caselle Airport
Bergamo – Orio al Serio Airport
Verona – Verona Airport
Milan – Malpensa Airport
Florence – Peretola Airport
Turkey
Istanbul – Istanbul Airport
United States of America
New York - John F Kennedy International
Germany
Frankfurt - Frankfurt Airport

References

Lists of airline destinations